Survilla is a Belarusian surname that may refer to:

 Ivonka Survilla (b. 1936) - President of the Rada of the Belarusian Democratic Republic
 Maria Paula Survilla (1964-2020) - professor of ethnomusicology and an ethnocultural activist